The 1978 WBF World Invitational Badminton Championships sanctioned by former governing body World Badminton Federation (WBF) took place in the month of February in Hong Kong. This invitational tournament was held prior to the first official WBF World Championships which was held in Bangkok later in that year. The individual competitions were conducted. At the end of day, China won all the disciplines except Mixed doubles which was won by host Hong Kong.

Medalists

Semifinal results

Final results

References 

 
1978 in badminton
Badminton in Hong Kong
1978 in Hong Kong sport
International sports competitions hosted by Hong Kong